Nemšová is a town in the Trenčín District, Trenčín Region in northwestern Slovakia.

Geography
It is located in the Ilava Basin on the Váh and Vlára rivers at the foothills of the White Carpathians.

History
The first written record about Nemšová was in 1246. The present-day town exists since 1989, when it was created by merger of the villages of Nemšová, Ľuborča, Kľúčové and Trenčianska Závada.

Demographics
According to the 2001 census, the town had 6,136 inhabitants. 98.1% of inhabitants were Slovaks, 1.1% Czechs and 0.1% Moravians. The religious makeup was 92.9% Roman Catholics, 4.6% people with no religious affiliation, and 0.6% Lutherans.

Twin towns — sister cities

Hluk is twinned with:
 Hluk, Czech Republic

References

External links
 Town website

Cities and towns in Slovakia
Villages and municipalities in Trenčín District